The 1996–97 Dallas Stars season was the fourth National Hockey League season in Dallas, Texas (and 30th as a franchise) as they attempted to bounce back from their dismal last place finish in the Central Division, which they would, finishing first, clinching the first Division title for Dallas. They would face off against the Edmonton Oilers in the Conference Quarterfinals, playing a tough series, losing 4-3.

Offseason

Regular season

Final standings

Schedule and results

Playoffs

Round 1: (2) Dallas Stars vs. (7) Edmonton Oilers

Player statistics

Regular season
Scoring

Goaltending

Playoffs
Scoring

Goaltending

Note: Pos = Position; GP = Games played; G = Goals; A = Assists; Pts = Points; +/- = plus/minus; PIM = Penalty minutes; PPG = Power-play goals; SHG = Short-handed goals; GWG = Game-winning goals
      MIN = Minutes played; W = Wins; L = Losses; T = Ties; GA = Goals-against; GAA = Goals-against average; SO = Shutouts; SA = Shots against; SV = Shots saved; SV% = Save percentage;

Awards and records

Transactions

Draft picks
Dallas's draft picks at the 1996 NHL Entry Draft held at the Kiel Center in St. Louis, Missouri.

See also
1996–97 NHL season

References
 

D
D
Dallas Stars seasons